Tasek is a railway station situated in Ipoh, Perak, Malaysia. Currently, this station is not in used as the ETS railway service does not stop here.

Buildings and structures in Ipoh
Railway stations in Perak